Oswald Eric Wreford-Brown (21 July 1877 – 7 July 1916) was an English cricketer and footballer.

Sporting career

Cricket 
Wreford-Brown was a right-handed batsman who, after captaining Charterhouse School's cricket team, later played for Gloucestershire. He made a single first-class appearance for the team, during the 1900 season, against Middlesex. From the tailend, he scored five runs in the only innings in which he batted.

Football 
Wreford-Brown played football for Charterhouse School and later as a senior player for amateur clubs Old Carthusians, Free Foresters, Corinthian and Old Salopians. He won the 1898–99 London Senior Cup with Old Carthusians and the 1902–03 Arthur Dunn Challenge Cup with Old Salopians.

Personal life 
Wreford-Brown's older brother, Charles and nephew, Anthony, both played first-class cricket. He was educated at a number of schools, before joining Charterhouse School in 1891. He later spent time in Canada and in 1902, became a member of the Stock Exchange and a partner in a law firm.

First World War 
In November 1914, during the early months of the First World War, Wreford-Brown was commissioned into the Northumberland Fusiliers as a temporary lieutenant. His regiment arrived on the Western Front in July 1915, two months after his brother Claude had been killed in West Flanders. Wreford-Brown was promoted to temporary captain on 8 September 1915. On 5 July 1916, during the Battle of the Somme, Wreford-Brown's promotion to full captain was confirmed, but he was mortally wounded in the leg by a shell near Fricourt and died two days later at 5th Casualty Clearing Station in Corbie. He was buried in Corbie Communal Cemetery.

References

External links
Oswald Wreford-Brown at Cricket Archive 

1877 births
1916 deaths
English cricketers
Gloucestershire cricketers
People from Clifton, Bristol
Footballers from Bristol
British Army personnel of World War I
British military personnel killed in the Battle of the Somme
Royal Northumberland Fusiliers officers
Old Carthusians F.C. players
Corinthian F.C. players
English expatriates in Canada
Association footballers not categorized by position
Oswald
English footballers
Military personnel from Bristol
Cricketers from Bristol
19th-century English lawyers